Alfredo Alejandro Rojas Acuña (born 19 June 1985) is a Chilean footballer who currently plays for San Marcos de Arica in the Primera B de Chile.

External links
 

1987 births
Living people
Chilean footballers
Tercera División de Chile players
Primera B de Chile players
Chilean Primera División players
Deportes Linares footballers
Deportes Temuco footballers
Club Deportivo Palestino footballers
Deportes Iberia footballers
San Luis de Quillota footballers
Universidad de Concepción footballers
Sportspeople from Valparaíso
Association football midfielders